Randi Jayne Zuckerberg (born February 28, 1982) is an American businesswoman. She is the former director of market development and spokesperson for Facebook, and a sister of the company's co-founder and CEO Mark Zuckerberg. Prior to working at Facebook, she was a panelist on Forbes on Fox. As of May 2014, she is founder and CEO of Zuckerberg Media, editor-in-chief (EIC) of Dot Complicated, a digital lifestyle website, and creator of Dot., an animated television show about a young girl (the eponymous Dot) who uses technology to enhance both her educational experiences and recreational activities.

Career

Before Facebook
After graduating from Harvard, Randi Zuckerberg worked for two years in marketing for advertising firm Ogilvy & Mather. She has stated in articles and interviews that to her it was a dream job in which she enjoyed the work and was on a good track for professional advancement.

Facebook
In late 2004, Randi's brother Mark asked her to join him at his startup Facebook, which he said was understaffed with people willing to travel and who could explain his vision. Randi took a position that required relocation and a cut in pay but with stock options. She has stated that she initially thought this was a temporary position that might last six months. Once she was in Silicon Valley and part of the innovation-driven community, she became fascinated with the possibilities and remained for ten years.

Ranked among 50 "Digital Power Players" by The Hollywood Reporter in 2010, Zuckerberg organized, and was also a correspondent for the ABC News/Facebook Democratic Party and Republican Party U.S. presidential primaries debates in 2008.

Zuckerberg told the Wall Street Journal that her Facebook journalist team was treated at the DNC "like rock stars".

Post-Facebook
In August 2011, Zuckerberg resigned from Facebook and announced her new social media firm, named "Zuckerberg Media". Since starting Zuckerberg Media, Randi has produced shows and digital content for BeachMint, the Clinton Global Initiative, Cirque du Soleil, the United Nations, Condé Nast and Bravo.

Writing
Zuckerberg has written three adult non-fiction books: 
 Spark Your Career in Advertising, a SparkNotes book published in 2007
 Dot Complicated, her first book with HarperCollins, published in October 2013
 Pick Three: You Can Have It All (Just Not Every Day), published in May 2018

She has also written two children's picture books: 
 Dot., published in November 2013
 Missy President, published in October 2016

Appearances
Zuckerberg appeared on the Today Show on January 26, 2016 in a segment entitled "2016 Netiquette" in which she discussed modern day etiquette on the Internet.

Acting

In the cartoon adaptation of Dot. she voices the character "Ms. Randi", Dot's music teacher who organizes the children's choir at the community center.

Advisory Roles
In December 2021, Zuckerberg was brought on as an inaugural brand advisory council member with Okcoin crypto exchange in the company's initiative to bring more women into the cryptocurrency market.

Personal life
Zuckerberg and her husband Brent Tworetzky have two sons. The family resides in New York City.

In 2011, Zuckerberg advocated for the abolition of anonymity on the Internet to protect children and young adults from cyberbullying. She explained how anonymity is protective for perpetrators.

References

External links
 Dot Complicated official website
 
 
 

1982 births
Living people
21st-century American businesspeople
Activists from California
American business writers
Women business writers
American computer businesspeople
American Internet celebrities
American marketing businesspeople
American online publication editors
American social activists
American women chief executives
Businesspeople from New York (state)
Businesspeople from the San Francisco Bay Area
Facebook employees
Harvard College alumni
Internet activists
Marketing women
People from Dobbs Ferry, New York
People from White Plains, New York
Writers from Palo Alto, California
21st-century American businesswomen
Randi